Major General Dahir Adan Elmi, also known as Dahir Aden Indha Qarshe, is a Somali military general. He is the former chief of the Somali Army.
General Dahir Adan Elmi hails from Sheekhaal   clan.

Career

Ogaden campaign
General Elmi led armored Somali National Army (SNA) battalions in the Qabri Dahare Front during the late 1970s Ogaden campaign. Qabri Dahare was the second city to fall during the offensive. The war was part of a broader SNA plan to unite all of the Somali-inhabited territories in the Horn region into a Greater Somalia (Soomaaliweyn).

Upon successful capture of Qabri Dahare in July 1977, the then Major Dahir Aden Indha Qarshe continued to be part of important northern fronts leading armoured battalions in the Northern Front under the command of the 26th Division.

Chief of Army
On 13 March 2013, Elmi was appointed Chief of Army at a transfer ceremony in Mogadishu, where he replaced General Abdulkadir Sheikh Dini. Abdirisaq Khalif Elmi served as Elmi's Deputy Army Chief.

Elmi's term as Chief of Army ended on 25 June 2014, when he and his deputy General Khalif Elmi were transferred by presidential decree to other positions. The shuffle was part of a larger major national security reform. Elmi was succeeded as Chief of Army by General Abdullahi Anod, the former commander of the presidential guard unit, with General Abdullahi Osman Agey concurrently appointed as the new Deputy Chief of Army.

On August 16, 2018, General Dahir Adan Elmi "Indhaqarshe" was reappointed as the chief of the army.

Notes

References

Somalian military leaders
Living people
1948 births
Somalian generals